Mercatello sul Metauro (Romagnol: Mercatèl) is a comune (municipality) in the Province of Pesaro e Urbino in the Italian region Marche, located about  west of Ancona and about  southwest of Pesaro.

Economy is mostly based on agriculture and sheep husbandry.

History
Mercatello is known as a settlement of the Umbri in the 12th century BC. Later it was conquered by the ancient Romans; destroyed during the barbaric invasions, it was rebuilt by the Lombards in the 6th century as Pieve d'Ico. First under Città di Castello and Massa Trabaria (9th century), it was turned into an autonomous fortified commune in 1235 by Pope Gregory IX. In 1437 it was annexed to the Duchy of Urbino; in 1636 it became part of the Papal States.

Main sights
 Pieve Collegiata (with walls from the original 10th century Romanesque edifice), rebuilt in 1363.
 Gothic church of St. Francis (13th century), with a notable collection of paintings from the 12th to 17th centuries (including a portrait of Federico III da Montefeltro attributed to Benedetto da Maiano or Francesco di Giorgio Martini).
 Ducal Palace (15th century), also attributed to Francesco di Giorgio Matrini
 Palazzaccio (16th century).

References

Cities and towns in the Marche